Nat Quansah is a botanist from Ghana, and earned a doctorate in philosophy in pteridology from the University of London, Goldsmiths College. He received a master's degree in botany at the University of Cape Coast, Ghana. He has taught courses on ethnobotany at the University of Antananarivo. Since 2008 he has served as the academic director for the Madagascar: Traditional Medicine and healthcare Systems summer program. From 2013 to 2014, he served as academic director for the School for International Training (SIT) program Tanzania: Zanzibar — Coastal Ecology and Natural Resource Management.

He was awarded the Goldman Environmental Prize in 2000, for his works on health care, cultural tradition and forest conservation, based in Ambodisakoana, Madagascar.  He founded a healthcare clinic in Ambodisakoana, Madagascar in 1994 that developed and implemented the Integrated Health Care and Conservation Program. The program integrates the diverse health, economic, biological, cultural backgrounds of local people to simultaneously address healthcare and conservation needs. The work of the clinic has been done in cooperation with the World Wide Fund for Nature and treated thousands of patients-many with native and threatened medicinal plants.

References 

Year of birth missing (living people)
Living people
20th-century Ghanaian botanists
Ghanaian environmentalists
Ghanaian expatriates in Madagascar
Philosophy academics
Goldman Environmental Prize awardees